Kabaso Chongo (born 11 February 1992) is a Zambian professional footballer who currently plays as a defender for TP Mazembe.

International career

International goals
Scores and results list Zambia's goal tally first.

Honours 
TP Mazembe
Winner
 Linafoot: 2013–14

References

External links 
 
 
 TP Mazembe Profile

1992 births
Living people
Zambian footballers
Konkola Mine Police F.C. players
TP Mazembe players
Zambian expatriate footballers
Expatriate footballers in the Democratic Republic of the Congo
Zambian expatriate sportspeople in the Democratic Republic of the Congo
Association football defenders
People from Mufulira
Zambia international footballers